Malcolm Shabazz City High School is a four-year public alternative high school in Madison, Wisconsin, USA. It was named in honor of the activist Malcolm X, also known as Malcolm Shabazz. It was founded as Malcolm Shabazz High School in 1971, changing its name after merging with City High School (founded 1972) in 1979. The school is located at 1601 N Sherman Ave., the same building as Madison's Sherman Middle School.

Shabazz is known for its informal atmosphere (students refer to teachers and the principal by their first names) and emphasis on individuality and social and political activism. According to former a social studies teacher, Gene Delcourt, "Shabazz was designed to be an alternative school for the sake of it being an alternative school, rather than it being a last chance for diploma completion or the last chance for kids who were falling through the cracks. When the school was founded, it was originally founded by students who were motivated to learn something other than what mainstream schools were teaching. Teachers responded to that by teaching their passion."

Admission
Students must apply for admission to Shabazz, with new students being accepted at the beginning of each semester.

Academics
Shabazz operates on a quarterly schedule. It offers a varied selection of courses, including The First Amendment (social studies), science of global warming, rap as poetry (English), and American Sign Language. All new students are required to take an anti-discrimination social studies course called Mirrors.

Students at Shabazz have dual enrollment with their "home school" (neighborhood school within the Madison Metropolitan School District) and are eligible to take courses at both schools.

Service Learning
Shabazz is a National Demonstration Site for Service Learning and is considered a "leader school" in the service-learning movement. Service-learning projects are incorporated into courses such as Project Green Teen, "an environmental service learning class that addresses authentic environmental needs in multiple communities", and Road to Indian Country, a social studies class on contemporary Native Americans that involves a week-long service trip to the Pine Ridge Indian Reservation.

References

External links
 

High schools in Madison, Wisconsin
Educational institutions established in 1971
Alternative schools in the United States
Public high schools in Wisconsin